Paul William Evans (born 13 April 1961) is a former distance runner from England, who ran in the 10000m track final at the 1992 Barcelona Olympics and 1996 Atlanta Olympics. He took up running at 25, having been a footballer. He was a member of Belgrave Harriers and the City of Norwich Athletics Club.

Evans came second in the 1996 Great North Run, third in the 1996 London Marathon, and won the 1996 Chicago Marathon at the age of 35. His 2:08:52 in Chicago places him fifth on the UK all-time marathon list. Other achievements include a half-marathon best time of 61:18, and a course record in the premier Swedish 30 km cross country running race Lidingöloppet in 1995.

He is now athletics development officer for Norfolk.

Achievements

References

External links 
 Belgrave Harriers website
  City of Norwich AC website
 
 
 
Power of 10 UK Marathon Rankings
gbrathletics

1961 births
Living people
English male long-distance runners
Chicago Marathon male winners
British male marathon runners
Athletes (track and field) at the 1992 Summer Olympics
Athletes (track and field) at the 1996 Summer Olympics
Olympic athletes of Great Britain